Seán Fallon (26 September 1937 – 4 July 1995) was an Irish Fianna Fáil politician from Athlone, County Westmeath.

A member of Westmeath County Council and Athlone Urban District Council for nearly forty years from 1967, he was a senator from 1981 to 1995, and Cathaoirleach of Seanad Éireann from 1992 until his death.

He was first elected in 1981, to the 15th Seanad, on the Industrial and Commercial Panel, and was returned to the Seanad in subsequent elections until his death.

References

1937 births
1995 deaths
Fianna Fáil senators
Cathaoirligh of Seanad Éireann
Members of the 15th Seanad
Members of the 16th Seanad
Members of the 17th Seanad
Members of the 18th Seanad
Members of the 19th Seanad
Members of the 20th Seanad
Local councillors in County Westmeath